Dan Albert John Koehl is a French-Swedish zookeeper, elephant trainer, and stablemaster.
An author of the Elephant Encyclopedia, he has been described as "one of Europe's most renowned experts on elephants".

Early years 

Dan Koehl was born 28 October 1959 in Stockholm, Sweden, the fifth child of parents Gösta Köhl (1916–1996), Swedish engineer and Margot Nordholm (1922–2006).

Koehl grew up in Mountain View, California, United States, and on Östermalm in Stockholm. He studied zookeeping at Enskede gårds gymnasium, besides higher education at Stockholm University and Calle Flygare Teaterskola. Koehl began his career in aquarium and zoo-shops, and as commissioned shepherd for the Royal Herd of Sheep at Gärdet in Stockholm. He carried out apprenticeship as elephant-keeper at Circus Scott in Stockholm under elephant trainer Banda Vidane, as mahout in Sri Lanka and India, and in traditional German elephant management at Hanover Zoo and Tierpark Hagenbeck in Hamburg, Germany, by elephant chief trainer Karl Kock.

Professional career

Since the late 1970s, Dan Koehl has served as head elephant keeper, stable master (Equerry) and consultant at zoos, circuses and ranches around the world. European locations have included Skansen, Cirkus Scott, Hellabrunn Zoo (Munich), Borås Wildlife Park, Tiergarten Schönbrunn, Dresden Zoo, Zoolandia. Parco Natura Viva, Kolmården Wildlife Park, Circus Krone, Tiergarten Walding, Karlsruhe Zoo and Prague Zoo. While at Skansen, pending the departure of the stable's elephants "Nika" and "Shiva" to inferior living conditions abroad, he figured in a campaign that sparked nationwide debate over "Stockholm's beloved elephants". Despite described by Cynthia Moss in Elephant Memories as "among the best-cared-for and happiest I had ever seen in captivity", after much controversy, Skansen's elephants were shipped to Cricket Park, England, only to face premature death.

At Tiergarten Schönbrunn in Vienna 1998, Koehl assisted Director  Dr Helmut Pechlaner in elephants retraining and staff management when the zoo was induced to establish a new team of elephant keepers, facing a critical campaign concerning its keeping of elephants. Likewise he assisted Director  Dr Herbert Lücker with elephant training and staff coaching in Dresden Zoo 1999, when the zoo was under criticism by members of animal rights organisations.

At Kolmården Wildlife Park, Koehl was commissioned "royal head groom" for the management of the elephants "Boa" and "Saonoi" donated to King Carl XVI Gustaf of Sweden by King Bhumibol Adulyadej of Thailand. Since the 1990s worldwide locations have included Elephant Experience and Sondelani Game Lodge in Zimbabwe, Pinnawala Elephant Orphanage in Sri Lanka, and Airavata Elephant Foundation and the elephant Sanctuary Kulen Elephant Forest, both latter ones in Cambodia.

Dan Koehl has contributed to various animals and wildlife care and preservation foundations related especially to elephants, including Asian elephant victims of war at Pinnawala Elephant Orphanage. and has since early nineties been a contributing Professional member to the Elephant Managers Association, as Deputy of the Executive Secretary for the European Elephant Keepers and Managers Association (EEKMA) 1998–2008, he co-worked out the Elephant management safety guidelines (2002). Koehl has served as board of director for Elefanten-Schutz Europa, as Chairperson for the Swedish organisation Defend the elephants and the Swedish National Union of Aquaristic Societies (SARF), and as Web developer created websites for enterprises like Tropicarium Kolmården, and ImageWare Austria. Since 2023 he is advisor to leaders in elephant venue auditing, Asian Captive Elephant Standards (ACES), as part of a program coordinated by Deutsche Gesellschaft für Internationale Zusammenarbeit (GIZ) and the Pacific Asia Travel Association.

Koehl has been residing in Siem Reap, Cambodia since 2019, being responsible for care and management of elephants and Mahouts as elephant trainer, manager and welfare director at Kulen Elephant Forest.
.

Research career
Parallel to lecturing in zoology, Dan Koehl has been documenting research about elephants, creating the website Elephant Encyclopedia and the Elephant Listserver (elephant-@listserver.wineasy.se), both  in 1995 as a collaboration with the Elephant Research Foundation and its founder Jeheskel Shoshani,  who assisted in creating a FAQ-section and zoological research at the website Elephant Encyclopedia.

Elephant Encyclopedia 
The website Elephant Encyclopedia has been online since 1995. Since 2006, it comprises the world's largest research database on individual elephants (and possibly on individual animals from a single species overall). Cited by journalists, organisations and in scientific works, it has notably figured in regard to elephant endotheliotropic herpesvirus and to evolution of cancer suppression.

References

External links
Elephant Encyclopedia and database

Year of birth missing (living people)
Elephant trainers
20th-century Swedish educators
Living people
People from Stockholm